Ramakrishna is a 2004 Indian Tamil-language family drama film directed by Agathiyan and produced by Sivasakthi Pandian. The film stars Jai Akash, Sridevika, along with Vijay Kumar, Vani and others. Deva scored the soundtrack and background music.

Cast 

 Jai Akash as Ramakrishna 
 Sridevika as Pooncholai 
 Vani as Pavalakodi 
 Vijayakumar as the village chief
 Saranya Ponvannan as Ramakrishna's mother
 Jaguar Thangam as Pooncholai's uncle 
 Charle as Pavalakodi's brother
 Paravai Muniyamma
 Manochitra
 Sabitha Anand
 Vaishali
 Halwa Vasu
 Scissor Manohar
 Muthukaalai

Production
Ramakrishna marked the third collaboration between Agathiyan and Sivasakthi Pandian. The makers initially approached Nandha to play the lead role but he turned down the offer. The film was shot in many locales in Tamilnadu and Kerala and was also shot at Kulu Manali and London.

Soundtrack 

The soundtracks and background score are composed by Deva and lyrics written by Agathiyan. The voices to the songs are given by Deva, Sadhana Sargam, Paravai, Karthik, Udit Narayan.

Release
The release of the film was delayed after the failure of Sivasakthi Pandian's earlier film Kadhale Nimmadhi.

A critic from Sify opined that "Now after a break, he [Agathiyan] is back with Ramakrishna with an all new star cast set against a village milieu which just does not live up to his earlier works". A critic from Behindwoods wrote "In overall, the film has a strong story line, screenplay and some double meaning dialogues for some added entertainment, in a typical Agathian style, who is the director of this movie".

References 

Indian drama films
2004 films
Films scored by Deva (composer)
2000s Tamil-language films
Films directed by Agathiyan
2004 drama films